Edwige Djedjemel (born 28 October 1988) is an Ivorian female professional basketball player.

External links
Profile at fiba.com

1988 births
Living people
Sportspeople from Abidjan
Ivorian women's basketball players